The Basketball Champions League MVP, or Basketball Champions League MVP of the Season, is the annual award bestowed to the player that is deemed to be the "Most Valuable Player" during the full season of the Basketball Champions League (BCL). The Basketball Champions League is the third-tier level European-wide men's professional club basketball league in Europe. The award is given by FIBA. The award has existed since the Basketball Champions's League inaugural season 2016–17 season.

Voting criteria
The Basketball Champions League MVP is chosen by a vote of the fans online, a vote of media journalists and representatives, and a vote of all of the head coaches of all of the teams in each season of the league. The fans, the media, and the league's head coaches each get 1/3 of the vote distribution.

Winners

Notes

References

External links
Basketball Champions League (official website)
FIBA (official website)

Basketball Champions League awards and honors
Basketball most valuable player awards